Denis Lindsay (born 1916, date of death unknown) was a South African professional footballer who played as a goalkeeper for Huddersfield Town in the Football League. He was born in Benoni, South Africa in 1916.

References

1916 births
Year of death missing
Association football goalkeepers
English Football League players
Huddersfield Town A.F.C. players
South African soccer players